Kadary Richmond (born August 25, 2001) is an American college basketball player for the Seton Hall Pirates of the Big East Conference. He previously played for the Syracuse Orange.

High school career
Richmond played for Midwood High School in his hometown of Brooklyn as a freshman before transferring to South Shore High School. He helped South Shore win two Public Schools Athletic League Class AA titles. Richmond played a postgraduate season at Brewster Academy in Wolfeboro, New Hampshire. He averaged 12.5 points, six rebounds and 3.8 assists per game, receiving First Team All-New England Preparatory School Athletic Council Class AAA honors. A four-star recruit, Richmond committed to playing college basketball for Syracuse over offers from UConn, Florida State, Cincinnati and Georgetown.

College career

Syracuse University
On December 3, 2020, Richmond made his first career start for Syracuse in the absence of Buddy Boeheim. He recorded a freshman season-high 16 points, seven rebounds, six assists, four steals and three blocks in a 75–45 win over Niagara. As a freshman, he averaged 6.3 points, 3.1 assists, 2.6 rebounds and 1.6 steals in 21 minutes per game.

Seton Hall University
After the season, Richmond transferred to Seton Hall. On January 8, 2022, he scored a career-high 27 points in a 90-87 overtime win over UConn. Richmond began playing more minutes later in January 2022 due to Bryce Aiken being in concussion protocol, and coach Kevin Willard said of Richmond, “I think you’re starting to see the evolution of a really, really good player.”

Career statistics

College

|-
| style="text-align:left;"| 2020–21
| style="text-align:left;"| Syracuse
| 28 || 3 || 21.0 || .453 || .333 || .721 || 2.6 || 3.1 || 1.6 || .5 || 6.3
|-
| style="text-align:left;"| 2021–22
| style="text-align:left;"| Seton Hall
| 32 || 26 || 25.9 || .402 || .345 || .750 || 3.6 || 4.1 || 1.7 || .3 || 8.8
|- class="sortbottom"
| style="text-align:center;" colspan="2"| Career
| 60 || 29 || 23.6 || .420 || .342 || .737 || 3.2 || 3.6 || 1.7 || .4 || 7.7

References

External links
Seton Hall Pirates bio
Syracuse Orange bio

2001 births
Living people
American men's basketball players
Basketball players from New York City
Sportspeople from Brooklyn
Point guards
Shooting guards
Syracuse Orange men's basketball players
Seton Hall Pirates men's basketball players
Brewster Academy alumni